= Taganrog Post Office =

Post Office

- Таганрогский почтамт (Russian)
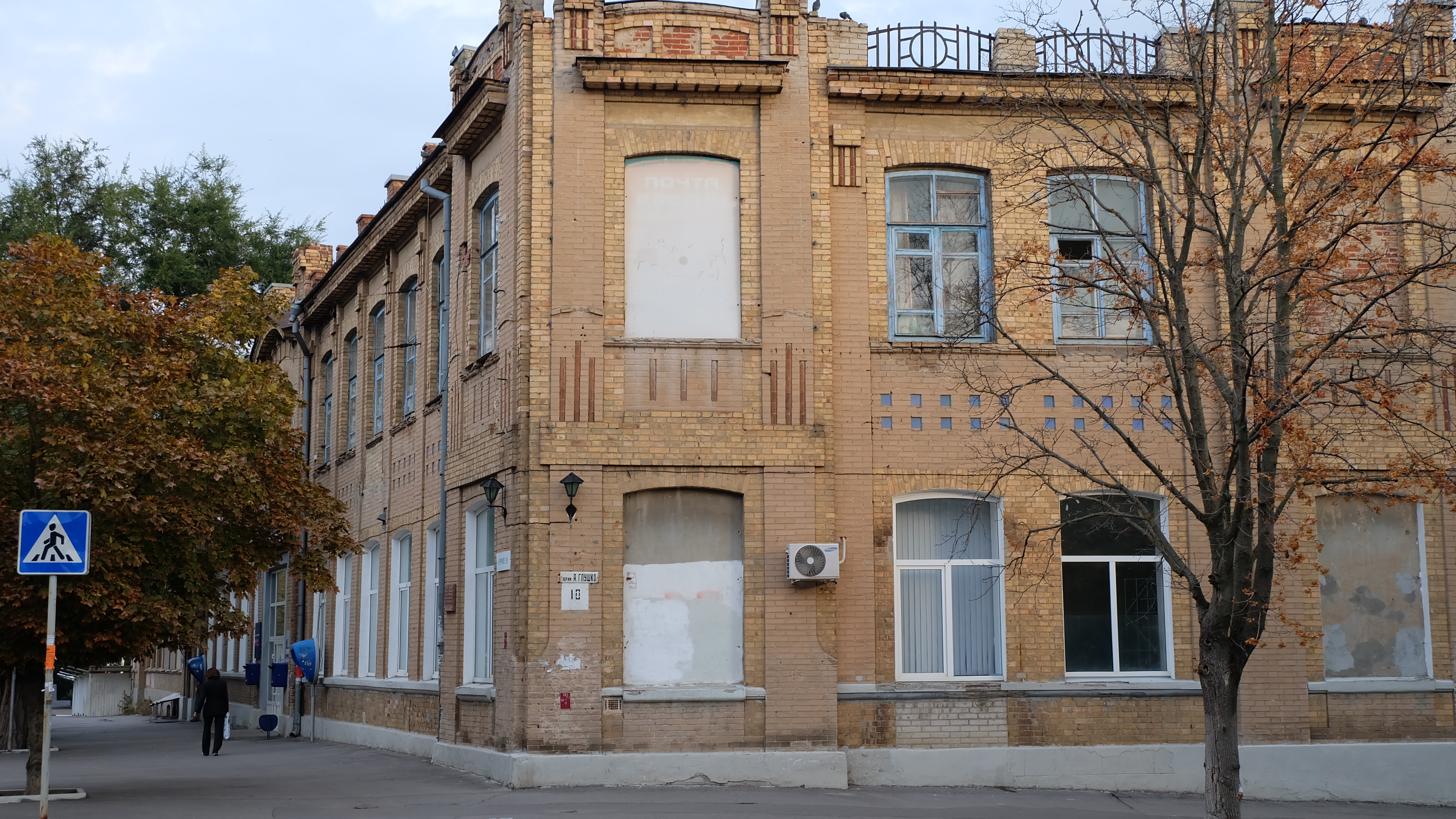
- Object of cultural heritage, built in the beginning of the 20th century

- Location within Russia
- 47°12′51″N 38°55′41″E
- Location: Taganrog, Rostov oblast Russia

History
- Built: 1911

Site notes
- Architect: banker A.A. Davidovich
- Architectural style: Art Nouveau style

The Taganrog Post Office, also the banking house of Davidovich (Russian:Таганрогский почтамт, также банкирский дом Давидовичей ), is an object of cultural heritage, built in the beginning of the 20th century in Taganrog, Rostov Region. The building was created in the Art Nouveau style. Address of the building is Frunze street, 38.

== History ==
The building of the modern main post office was built in 1911 by the order of the banker A.A. Davidovich. The brick was used as the main building material. The first floor of the building was allocated under office of bank "E. Facini and Co.", the opening of which took place on January 20, 1912. The founder of this office was Emmanuil Karlovich Facini. On the building was posted a sign "Bank house of E. Fachini and Co". In the same year on the second floor of the banking house of Davidovich was placed the postal and telegraph office, earlier it was in the house of Taganrog of merchant Skurich in Greek street. This building hasn't remained till our times. When the nationalization of the building took place, the Taganrog communication center was placed on the first and second floor. In 1981 the balconies of the Taganrog post office building were lost. For more than centenary history of the house there weren't made capital repairs and nevertheless, the building remains in good condition.

== Description ==
The building is unplastered. The facade is created using bricks of yellow and gray color. The main entrance is decorated with arc-shaped cornice. The characteristic elements of the architectural style of Art Nouveau were the balcony grilles, now they are lattices of a parapet of a flat form.
